The thermo-optic coefficient of a material is the change in refractive index with the response to temperature. This value itself also depends on the present temperature of the material and so has second-order behaviours. At low temperatures (0-400°C), the relationship is linear but at higher ones it exhibits a second-order polynomial behaviour.

Applications 
The relationship can be used in temperature measurement by Fibre Bragg Gratings (FBGs) where if no physical strain is applied, a Bragg's Wavelength shift of 1pm per 0.1°C temperature change can be measured. Fiber Bragg Grating Sensors

References

Geometrical optics
Refraction